Fault Lines is a 2012 English language album by Danish band Turboweekend that was released 25 June 2012 on EMI. It hit #1 on Hitlisten, the official Danish Albums Chart in its first week of release.

On 30 April 2012, the band had pre-released the single "On My Side" in preparation for the release of the album.

Track listing

Charts

References

2012 albums